H. africanus may refer to:
 Holodactylus africanus, a gecko species found in Eastern Africa
 Hydrolagus africanus, the African chimaera, a fish species found in Kenya, Mozambique and Namibia

Synonyms
 Hibiscus africanus, a synonym for Hibiscus trionum, a plant species

See also
 Africanus (disambiguation)